SA Navy or S.A. Navy may refer to:
Royal Saudi Navy
South African Navy